Touring the Angel was a 2005/2006 concert tour by English electronic group Depeche Mode in support of the act's 11th studio album, Playing the Angel, which was released in October 2005.

The tour, which was officially announced in June 2005 in Düsseldorf, Germany, kicked off in October with a warm-up show in New York City called "Starting the Angel". It encompassed two continents, Europe and North America, with two legs between each.

The concerts held in Assago, near Milan, Italy were filmed and later released on a DVD release entitled Touring the Angel: Live in Milan.

Overview
The stage set, which was designed by Anton Corbijn, was elaborate compared to previous Depeche Mode tours. It consisted of specially constructed pods to contain the act's MIDI controllers. Hidden screens at the rear of the stage, which displayed distorted images of the band members and movies related to the song being performed, were unveiled midway during the group's performance. These screens were accompanied by a large grey ball-shaped prop on the left of the stage, which contained an additional screen as well as a LED display which emitted various messages.

The tour began in late October 2005 with a special rehearsal show in New York City, dubbed "Starting the Angel". The date was exclusive to invited guests, most of whom won access through radio station and internet contests. The first full-fledged show was in Tampa, Florida in early November, kicking off a six-week North American leg. The tour was supposed to begin in Sunrise, Florida, but that date was cancelled due to the after-effects of Hurricane Wilma, which had spread across southern Florida a week prior to the show. The first leg ultimately concluded mid-December at the annual Almost Acoustic Christmas show, organised by radio station KROQ, in Universal City, California. The unique performance saw the band play a selection of songs in a stripped-down acoustic set.

In January 2006, the group kicked off an extensive tour of Europe, beginning in Dresden, Germany. The leg lasted twelve weeks and included multiple shows in a number of cities. It also saw the addition of "Leave in Silence" in the group's setlists, which had not been performed live since the Black Celebration Tour in 1986. The tour eventually finished in early April with two dates in London; the band were the first act to perform in the newly refurbished Wembley Arena.

In April 2006, the group returned to North America for a second round of shows, taking place in a mixture of indoor and outdoor venues. The leg began in Mountain View, California, followed by an appearance at the Coachella Valley Music and Arts Festival in Indio, California.

In May 2006, the tour was slightly disrupted when lead singer Dave Gahan developed laryngitis during the group's performance at the Starlight Theatre in Kansas City, Missouri. Six tracks into the concert, Gahan left the stage for Martin Gore to begin his solo set performance, which was promptly extended by four additional songs until Gahan's condition was clarified. The show was officially cut and the concert to be held the following night in Chicago was cancelled. A press release regarding the cancellations stated that Gahan's voice was "challenged throughout the concert by the unusually cold temperatures at the venue" as well as a result of "coming off three concerts in Mexico." No make-up date was announced to compensate for the axed performance in Kansas City. The tour resumed in Wantagh, New York and concluded later in the month in Bristow, Virginia.

In June 2006, the group began a second leg in Europe. All shows, apart from one in Dublin, were held outdoors. A number of dates were festival appearances, from the Heineken Jammin' Festival in Italy to the Benicàssim Festival in Spain. The leg kicked off in Nuremberg, Germany at the Rock im Park Festival.

Two dates on this leg were cancelled. A show to be held in Lisbon was pulled after it was claimed that the organisation promoting the shows had failed to pay suppliers' bills. Another date, to be held in Tel Aviv, Israel, was cancelled due to the Second Lebanon War. It was stated that the group's technical support team refused to travel to the region, citing "security fears". The show was to be their first ever in Israel, as well as the sole Asian performance and final date of the entire tour. The trek instead culminated in Athens at Terra Vibe Park in early August, after nine months and 124 shows. In total, the band played to more than 2.8 million people across 32 countries. The group eventually performed in Israel on Tour of the Universe in 2009.

Speaking about the tour, Gahan praised it as "probably the most enjoyable, rewarding live show we've ever done. The new material was just waiting to be played live. It took on a life of its own. With the energy of the crowds, it just came to life."

Audio recordings of concerts on Touring the Angel were made available through the band's website on double CD format or as a digital download under the generic name Recording the Angel. All dates on the second legs of North America and Europe, excluding the shows in Kansas City, Kristiansand and Benicàssim, were released.

In September 2006, a live DVD of the group's concerts at the Fila Forum in Milan, Italy was released, entitled Touring the Angel: Live in Milan. The video was filmed and directed by Blue Leach.

Setlist

Tour dates

Support acts

 The Bravery (3–12 November 2005; 3–9 December 2005; 13 January – 3 April 2006)
 Booka Shade (Berlin (28 June 2006))
 Chantage (Istanbul)
 DJ Gogo (Locarno)
 DJ Vania (Bucharest)
 Franz Ferdinand (Rome)
 Goldfrapp (Wantagh, Bremen, Arras, Berlin (12 and 13 June 2006), Leipzig and Nîmes)
 Timo Maas (Warsaw)
 Mohair (Aarhus)
 Muse (Stockholm)
 Natural Project (San Sebastián)
 Nova Generacia (Sofia)
 Pamela (Istanbul)

 Placebo (Budapest (12 June 2006) and Ljubljana)
 The Raveonettes (15 November – 1 December 2005; 5 and 7 June 2006; 22–26 July 2006; 1 August 2006)
 Second (San Sebastián and Granada)
 Scarling. (Rome)
 Schiller (Athens)
 Scissor Sisters (Mountain View)
 She Wants Revenge (27 April – 10 May 2006; 14–21 May 2006)
 Sistem (Bucharest)
 The Sisters of Mercy (Bratislava)
 Soulsavers (Rotterdam)
 Sugarplum Fairy (Stockholm)
 Șuie Paparude (Bucharest)
 Pati Yang (Warsaw)

Musicians

Depeche Mode
David Gahan – lead and backing vocals
Martin Gore – guitar, synthesizers, bass guitar, lead and backing vocals
Andrew Fletcher – synthesizers, backing vocals

Backup musicians
Peter Gordeno – synthesizers, bass guitar, backing vocals
Christian Eigner – drums

References

External links
 Official site

Depeche Mode concert tours
2005 concert tours
2006 concert tours